The 2021–22 Luxembourg National Division season is the 107th of top-tier association football in Luxembourg. The season began on 7 August 2021 and ended on 22 May 2022. The league champion will qualify to compete in the 2022–23 UEFA Champions League.

Fola Esch are the defending league champions.

Teams

No teams were relegated at the end of the previous season, and no teams were promoted from the Luxembourg Division of Honour.

Stadia and locations

League table

Results

Relegation play-offs
Two play-off matches were played between two teams from the 2021–22 Luxembourg National Division and two teams from the 2021–22 Luxembourg Division of Honour to determine which teams would participate in the 2022–23 Luxembourg National Division.

Statistics

Top scorers

See also
 Luxembourg Cup
 Luxembourg Division of Honour

References

External links
 

1
Luxembourg National Division seasons
Luxembourg